Ornipholidotos kirbyi is a butterfly in the family Lycaenidae. It is found in Nigeria, Cameroon, Equatorial Guinea, Gabon and the Republic of the Congo. The habitat consists of dense forests.

References

Butterflies described in 1895
Ornipholidotos
Butterflies of Africa